Mangi (Chief) Meli (or Mangi Meli Kiusa bin Rindi Makindara) (died in 1900) was a leader of the Chaga in the late 1890s. He was hanged by the German colonial government in March 1900. Meli is one of the heroes of the former Tanganyika colony, having been prominent in the fight against colonial encroachment on the slopes of Mount Kilimanjaro.  After his capture, Meli was convicted of rebellion and was hanged at a public execution as his people watched. Following his death, the German colonial administration ordered his head to be removed and it is believed to have been sent to Berlin to be used in phrenological studies. It was then apparently stored in a museum.

Mangi Meli chief's officer was Ndaskoi Msehiye Massamu, who led the Chaga forces that captured livestock in the Pare and Taveta areas of what is now Kenya. Ndaskoi lived in Masamunyi, where he raised his family, while others of his relatives moved to Msaranga, on the lower side of Old Moshi.

Mangi Meli fought two wars with the Germans, in the first war of June 1892 fighting for 2 days he defeated them include murdering a German governor and military leader in Kilimanjaro Von Bulow and expel them completely from Kilimanjaro, they returned after 1 year and 2 months in August 1893 with mercenary Nubi soldiers from Sudan and other Zulu soldiers from South Africa with more advanced machine guys and fought him the second war which also took two days and defeated him, he then retreated and seek peace with the Germans where they impose some terms and conditions. He was fined to provide labour and materials to build a new German army station at Old Moshi which he did. In 1900 the secret was revealed that he was again conspired with other chagga leaders and maasai and meru leaders to bring the biggest war to the Germans and expel them from Kilimanjaro once and for all, before that plan materialize he was captured jailed and after a trial he was found guilt and hanged outside the Germans boma on top of a deep ravine to Msangachi river at his residence in Old Moshi, Tsudunyi village with his 19 other followers who were his fellow leaders from everywhere in Kilimanjaro and Arusha. His head cut and taken to German and never to be returned until today.

Eventually captured by the Imperial German forces, Mangi Meli was publicly executed by hanging in March 1900 near today's Kolila High School in Kisamo Village. Efforts are currently being made to try to recover his skull and return it for proper burial in Tanzania.

References

Year of birth missing
19th-century births
1900 deaths
Tanzanian royalty